
Gmina Środa Wielkopolska is an urban-rural gmina (administrative district) in Środa Wielkopolska County, Greater Poland Voivodeship, in west-central Poland.

Villages
Apart from the town of Środa Wielkopolska, Gmina Środa Wielkopolska contains the villages and settlements of Annopole, Babin, Bieganowo, Brodowo, Brzeziak, Brzezie, Brzeziny, Chocicza, Chudzice, Chwałkowo, Czarne Piątkowo, Czartki, Dębicz, Dębiczek, Gajówka, Grójec, Henrykowo, Janowo, Januszewo, Jarosławiec, Kijewo, Koszuty, Koszuty-Huby, Lorenka, Mączniki, Marcelino, Marianowo Brodowskie, Nadziejewo, Nietrzanowo, Ołaczewo, Olszewo, Pętkowo, Pierzchnica, Pierzchno, Pławce, Podgaj, Połażejewo, Ramutki, Romanowo, Rumiejki, Ruszkowo, Słupia Wielka, Staniszewo, Starkowiec Piątkowski, Strzeszki, Szlachcin, Szlachcin-Huby, Tadeuszowo, Topola, Trzebisławki, Turek, Ulejno, Urniszewo, Winna Góra, Włostowo, Żabikowo, Zdziechowice, Zielniczki, Zielniki and Zmysłowo.

Neighbouring gminas
Gmina Środa Wielkopolska is bordered by the gminas of Dominowo, Kleszczewo, Kórnik, Kostrzyn, Krzykosy, Miłosław and Zaniemyśl.

References
Polish official population figures 2006

Sroda Wielkopolska
Środa Wielkopolska County